Chih-Kong Ken Yang (born August 17, 1970) is a professor of electrical engineering at the University of California, Los Angeles (UCLA), Director of the Integrated Circuits and Systems Laboratories (ICSL), and co-founder of Pluribus Networks, Inc.

Education and career 
He received his B.S. and M.S. degrees in electrical engineering in 1992 and his Ph.D. in 1998 from Stanford University under the supervision of Professor Mark Horowitz. Since then, he has been a professor at UCLA with over 100 journal and conference publications. He is an IEEE Fellow and was awarded the Northrop Grumman Excellence in Teaching Award, and IBM Faculty Development Fellow Award. In 2010, he co-founded Pluribus Networks, Inc. with Robert Drost and Sunay Tripathi.

Research 
His research interests are in the area of high-performance digital and mixed-signal circuit design and high-performance networking. Research areas include the design of high-speed data and clock-recovery circuits for large VLSI systems, design of low-power, high-performance computing building blocks, high-voltage drivers for MEMs applications, power optimization of computing systems, and analog-circuit power optimization for nanometer scale devices.

Honors and awards 
 IEEE Fellow, 2011

References

1970 births
UCLA Henry Samueli School of Engineering and Applied Science faculty
Living people
Taiwanese emigrants to the United States
Stanford University alumni
People from San Jose, California